The Canadian Golf Hall of Fame and Museum is a museum and hall of fame covering the history of the game of golf in Canada, and celebrating the careers and accomplishments of the most significant contributors to the game in that country. Operated by Golf Canada (governed by the Royal Canadian Golf Association), the governing body of golf in Canada, it is located on the grounds of Glen Abbey Golf Course in Oakville, Ontario, Canada, and is composed of an exhibit space (designed around 18 display spaces or 'holes'), a golf-related research library, and archives (containing both historical materials and the corporate records of the RCGA).

The Canadian Golf Hall of Fame is affiliated with the Canadian Museums Association, the Canadian Heritage Information Network, the International Sports Heritage Association, the Canadian Association for Sports Heritage, the Ontario Museum Association, and the Virtual Museum of Canada.

Inductees
Inductees in the hall of fame are divided into three categories: professional players, amateur players and builders - this last being those who have contributed to the development and success of the game in some exceptional fashion, whether it be primarily as coaches, superintendents, golf course architects, historians, or any other capacity.

In alphabetical order, the members are:

 R. Keith Alexander
 Stephen Ames
 Al Balding
 James A. Barclay
 Dave Barr
 David L. Black
 Kenneth Black
 Gayle Borthwick
 Jocelyne Bourassa
 Gordie Brydson
 Dorothy Campbell Hurd Howe
 Donald Carrick
 Dawn Coe-Jones
 Graham Cooke
 Geoffrey Cornish
 Gary Cowan
 George Cumming
 Marion Doherty
 Judy (Darling) Evans
 Phil Farley
 Pat Fletcher
 Bruce Forbes
 Brent Franklin
 Gail Graham
 Richard Grimm
 Dan Halldorson
 Florence Harvey
 Mary Ann Hayward
 Wilf Homenuik
 Jules Huot
 Lorie Kane
 Karl Keffer
 Ben Kern
 George Knudson
 Willie Lamb
 Stan Leonard
 George Lyon
 A.V. "Mac" Macan
 Ada Mackenzie
 Henry Martell
 Fritz Martin
 Roderick Hugh McIsaac
 Jack McLaughlin
 Gail Moore
 Alison Murdoch
 Albert Murray
 Charles Murray
 Jim Nelford
 Jack Nicklaus
 Moe Norman
 Herb Page
 Marilyn Palmer O'Connor
 Bob Panasik
 Claude Pattemore
 Sandra Post
 Ralph Reville
 Clinton Robinson
 Stephen Ross
 Doug Roxburgh
 Lorne Rubenstein
 Cathy Sherk
 Douglas Howard Silverberg
 C. Ross (Sandy) Somerville
 Rod Spittle
 Betty Stanhope-Cole
 John B. Steel
 Marlene Stewart Streit
 Alexa Stirling Fraser
 Violet Pooley Sweeny
 Warren Sye
 Gordon B. Taylor
 Stanley Thompson
 Mabel Gordon Thomson
 Margaret Todd
 Murray Carlyle Tucker
 Bob Vokey
 Lisa (Young) Walters
 Bob Weeks
 Mike Weir
 Nick Weslock
 Gordon Witteveen
 Robert Wylie
 Richard Zokol

References

External links
Official website

Golf in Canada
Golf museums and halls of fame
Sports hall of fame inductees
Halls of fame in Canada
Sports museums in Canada
Museums in the Regional Municipality of Halton
Buildings and structures in Oakville, Ontario
Canadian sports trophies and awards